Rafy Burgos (also known as El Cupido) is a Dominican singer. In 2003, Burgos received a nomination for a Lo Nuestro Award for Tropical New Artist of the Year.

References

Living people
21st-century Dominican Republic male singers
Bachata singers
Year of birth missing (living people)